Thomas M. Cooley High School was a public high school located at the intersection of Hubbell Avenue and Chalfonte Street, on the northwest side of Detroit, Michigan. The three-story, Mediterranean Revival-style facility opened its doors on September 4, 1928.

The school was named in honor of Thomas M. Cooley, a nineteenth-century jurist and former Chief Justice of the Michigan Supreme Court. Cooley was also a charter member, and first chairman, of the Federal Interstate Commerce Commission.

Due to budget constraints and declining enrollment, Cooley High School was closed at the end of the 2009–2010 academic year. On September 30, 2017, a fire severely damaged the auditorium and surrounding rooms.

The early years
Cooley High School's history dates to the late 1920s, a time when thousands of homes were built upon land acquired through Detroit's westernmost annexation efforts in the former Greenfield Township, and village of Strathmoor. Cooley High was constructed to accommodate a rapidly growing populace on the city's burgeoning northwest side.

The first five years of Cooley's existence was marked by rapid growth. In 1928, the student population stood at 1570, by 1932 the figure had climbed to 3750. That same year, noted author and motion picture celebrity, Frank Buck  visited Cooley High School; Buck thrilled a packed auditorium audience with travelogues of recent African excursions.

In the early years, Cooley students enjoyed a diverse offering of extracurricular activities; including such pursuits as fencing, table tennis, indoor track and field, swimming and diving, speed skating and ice hockey. Throughout much of the twentieth century, in a wide variety of sports, Cooley student-athletes regularly finished at or near the top in the quest for city league (DPSSAL)  supremacy.

Beyond the sporting venues of metropolitan Detroit, the Cardinals of Thomas M. Cooley High School will be remembered as one of the most successful programs in the history of Michigan interscholastic athletics.

1930s - 1940s
In 1932, the Cooley Cardinal football team won the Metropolitan League-Northern Division Championship; finishing the regular season at 7-0. In those seven games, only Mackenzie High School put points on the board versus the Cardinals. Three members of Cooley's legendary 1932 football team were selected to the Detroit News All-Metropolitan Team. That same school year, Cooley won the Detroit Public Secondary Schools Athletic League title in ice hockey and tennis; adding DPSSAL runner-up trophies in track and field and cross-country.

Claude Snarey, long time Cooley educator and track coach, was a six-time Michigan Intercollegiate Athletic Association track and field champion for Michigan Normal College (the forerunner of Eastern Michigan University). Between 1923 and 1926, Snarey won MIAA titles in the 100, 220 and 440-yard dash. Claude Snarey was a 1991 inductee to the EMU Athletic Hall of Fame; the football stadium at Livonia-Franklin High School is named in his honor.

During the 1941 football season, Coach Herb Smith led the Cooley Cardinals to a 9-0-1 record; Michigan sportswriters rewarded Cooley High with a consensus state championship.

1950s - 1960s
Future Major League Baseball All-Star Milt Pappas led Cooley to consecutive Metropolitan League Baseball Championships in 1956 and 1957. Milt won a total of 209 games during his 17-year professional career; he pitched a no-hitter as a member of the 1972 Chicago Cubs.

From 1954 through 1964, Cooley football teams posted an eleven-season record of 60-14-8; representing an impressive winning percentage of 81. As the 1960s unfolded, the Cardinals were a dominant force on the Detroit high school football scene. In 1961, Cooley finished 7-1; cracking the Associated Press Top-Ten rankings for the first time - ending the season rated tenth. The 1962 and 1963 teams were undefeated, producing a combined regular-season record of 15-0; both squads were ranked fourth in respective final AP polling.

Thanks in large measure to the guidance of Abe Eliowitz and Roger Parmentier, Cooley's football program rose to great heights during the 1950s and 60s. Eliowitz taught and coached at Cooley from 1947 until 1970. Prior to earning his teaching credentials, Abe was an All-American footballer at Michigan State University. Eliowitz also played five seasons in the Canadian Football League; he was inducted to the Canadian Football Hall of Fame in 1969.  Roger Parmentier played collegiate football at Wayne State University; he was captain of the 1953 squad. To this day, Coach Parmentier's winning percentage is recognized as the best in DPSSAL football history; Roger was inducted to the Michigan High School Football Coaches Hall of Fame in 1989.

From 1960 to 1964, Coach Harold Lindsay's swimming and diving program won five consecutive DPSSAL crowns for Cooley High School. In statewide competition, at the 1962 Michigan High School Athletic Association championships, All-American William "Bill" Jennison won a silver medal in the 100-yard butterfly; while Cooley's 200-yard freestyle relay quartet finished in fourth place. One year later, at the 1963 state finals, Jennison struck gold with his national high school record time of :52.60 in the butterfly event; Bill's performance remained on the books as the MHSAA record until 1971.
Jennison and fellow Cooley Cardinal, Joanne Scarborough competed at the 1964 US Olympic Trials.

John Pheney was an All-City swimmer and co-captain of Cooley's DPSSAL championship teams in 1963 and 1964; John placed 9th in the 100-yard backstroke at the 1963 MHSAA finals. Ten years later, Pheney coached Ann Arbor-Huron High School to the 1973 MHSAA team title in boys' swimming and diving; under Pheney's tutelage, Huron High was also MHSAA team runner-up in 1972, 1977 and 1980.

Other than Bill Jennison, the only Cardinal swimmer to make finals at a MHSAA championship was Robert Foley. By virtue of his 5th-place finish in the 200-yard individual medley and a 7th place showing in the 100-yard butterfly, Foley scored 17 team points for Cooley High at the 1967 state meet. Foley returned to the state swimming finals, in 1968; scoring 19 points for Cooley with a 5th in the individual medley and a 6th in the butterfly event.

1970s, 1980s, 1990s
Throughout Cooley's eighty-two year history, the men's basketball program enjoyed top-level success; the Cardinals were DPSSAL champions in 1973. During the late-1980s, in statewide competition, Cooley basketball reigned supreme; Coach Ben Kelso led the Cardinals to consecutive Michigan High School Athletic Association Championship titles in 1987, 1988, and 1989. Cooley won another DPSSAL basketball crown in 1992.

The 1982 Lady Cardinal basketball team won MHSAA District and Regional crowns; advancing all the way to the state tournament quarterfinal round versus five-time defending champion, Flint Northern High School.

Between 1975 and 1984, Cardinal football teams produced a 10-season record of 68-20 (.772). Cooley's 1980 squad went 9-0, earning a third place Associated Press ranking; the 1981 Cardinals finished 8-1, ending the season rated tenth.

Over the years, numerous Cooley track and field athletes have won individual DPSSAL and MHSAA gold medals; the Cardinals have also fared well in their quest for a state team title. In 1984 and 1985, Cooley's men finished as runners-up at the MHSAA Track and Field Finals. In 1991, Cooley High School brought home the MHSAA men's track and field championship trophy. At the 1991 championships, Cooley's 1600-meter relay team of Adams, David Norman, Johnson and Marco West established a MHSAA Class-A record of 3:16.05; the mark was not bettered until 2002.

Notable alumni
Robert L. Chapman (1939), editor of Roget's International Thesaurus
Anita Darian (1945), opera singer, soprano voice in The Tokens' 1961 hit "The Lion Sleeps Tonight"
Joe Ginsberg (1945), former MLB player (Detroit Tigers, Cleveland Indians, Kansas City Athletics, Baltimore Orioles, Chicago White Sox, Boston Red Sox, New York Mets)
Bill Roman (1947), former MLB player (Detroit Tigers)
Mike Ilitch (1947), Former CHS shortstop who created the Little Caesar's Pizza empire; owner the Detroit Tigers and Detroit Red Wings.
Darryl McDaniels (1964), known as 'DMC,' was one third of the rap group Run DMC along with Rev Run and Jam Master Jay.
Bob Langas (1948), played collegiate football at Wayne State; played professionally with the 1954 Baltimore Colts.
John McKinlay (1950), was a member of two United States Olympic Teams, participating in the 1952 Summer Olympics, Helsinki, Finland and the 1956 Summer Olympics Melbourne, Australia in the sport of Rowing (sport). McKinlay won a silver medal in the fours without coxswain with his twin brother Art McKinlay in the 1956 Summer Olympics Melbourne, Australia. McKinlay also won 6 US Rowing Championships and 8 Canadian Rowing Championships. McKinlay rowed out of the historic Detroit Boat Club and also attended and graduated from Boston University where he was Captain of the Crew in 1954 and 55. United States at the 1956 Summer Olympics
Art McKinlay (1950) Art McKinlay (January 20, 1932 – August 10, 2009) was an American      rower who competed in the 1956 Melbourne Summer Olympics. He was born in Detroit and is the twin brother of John McKinlay; both were 1950 graduates of Cooley High School. In 1956 along with his twin brother John, he was a crew member of the American boat that won the silver medal in the coxless fours event at the Melbourne Olympics. Rowing out of the Detroit Boat Club with his twin brother John, Art McKinlay won 6 US Rowing Championships and 8 Canadian Rowing Championships.
Marshall Rosenberg (1952) Rosenberg was the creator of Nonviolent Communication; he was also the founder and former Director of Educational Services for the Center for Nonviolent Communication, an international non-profit organization.
Milt Pappas (1957), former MLB pitcher; won 209 games during 17 seasons with Cincinnati,  Baltimore and the Chicago Cubs
Milan Stitt  (1959), Celebrated playwright, screenwriter and drama professor; best known for his play, The Runner Stumbles
James P. Hoffa (1959), All-City & All-State football player; lawyer; former President of  International Teamsters Union
Barbara Tarbuck (1959), Professional television and cinematic actress; most recently General Hospital and  Walking Tall.
Jem Targal (1965), bass guitarist and singer for the rock group Third Power.
Rich Fisher (1968), longtime Detroit Television News Anchorman with WXYZ, WJBK, and WKBD.
Rodolfo M. Foster (1969), (aka La Palabra), Afro-Cuban jazz musician/composer/impresario; contributor to the Salsa romántica genre
S. Epatha Merkerson (1970), renowned Emmy & Golden Globe Award-winning actress; star of NBC-TV series, Law & Order
Larry Fogle (1972), MHSAA Basketball Player of the Year; still holds DPSSAL single-game record of 73 points (vs. Cody High)
Ricky Lawson (1972), Noted session drummer; also toured with Michael Jackson on his "Bad" tour in 1987.
Roy Tarpley (1982), former NBA player
Anthony Watson (1982), basketball player 
Willie Green (1999), former professional basketball player and current head coach of the New Orleans Pelicans.
Chris Floyd, former NFL player
Obie Trice, Rap Music artist
Lional Dalton (1994),  Former NFL player.
Black Milk, hip-hop producer/rapper affiliated with Slum Village, Phat Kat, and Guilty Simpson

References

External links

 Detroit Public Schools — official Thomas Cooley High School website
Michigan High School Sports Index & History
Michigan High School Track and Field History
Michigan High School Football - since 1950
Michigan High School Basketball - since 1950

High schools in Detroit
Educational institutions established in 1928
Educational institutions disestablished in 2010
Defunct schools in Michigan
School buildings on the National Register of Historic Places in Michigan
School buildings completed in 1928
Unused buildings in Detroit
1928 establishments in Michigan
National Register of Historic Places in Detroit
Detroit Public Schools Community District
2010 disestablishments in Michigan